Coleophora haloxylonella is a moth of the family Coleophoridae. It is found in Algeria, Tunisia and Libya.

The larvae feed on Hammada articulata species. They feed on the shoots and possibly also on the fruits of their host plant.

References

haloxylonella
Moths described in 1915
Moths of Africa